Miss South Africa 2008 was held on 15 December 2008 in Sun City, South Africa. The winner will represent South Africa at Miss Universe 2009 and Miss World 2009. 12 contestants competed for crown.

Results
Color keys

Contestants

Judges 
 Sonia Raciti Oshry
 Esmaré Weideman
 Nivasha Naidoo
 Rosie Motene
 Bongani Nxumalo
 Gareth Tjasink

References

External links
 Miss South Africa Contestants

2008
South Africa
2008 in South Africa
December 2008 events in South Africa